National Route 23 is a national highway in South Korea connects Gangjin County to Dongnam District, Cheonan. It established on 31 August 1971.

Main stopovers
South Jeolla Province
 Gangjin County - Jangheung County - Yeongam County - Naju - Hampyeong County - Yeonggwang County
North Jeolla Province
 Gochang County
South Jeolla Province
 Yeonggwang County
North Jeolla Province
 Gochang County - Buan County - Gimje - Iksan
South Chungcheong Province
 Nonsan - Gongju - Cheonan
Sejong City
 Jeonui-myeon
South Chungcheong Province
 Cheonan
Sejong City
 Sojeong-myeon
South Chungcheong Province
 Cheonan

Major intersections

 (■): Motorway
IS: Intersection, IC: Interchange

South Jeolla Province

North Jeolla Province

South Chungcheong Province·Sejong City

References

23
Roads in South Jeolla
Roads in North Jeolla
Roads in South Chungcheong